Admiral's House may refer to:
 Admiral's House (Governors Island), New York
 Admiral's House, Hampstead, London
 Admiral's House (Washington), former name of Number One Observatory Circle